The Gerber Mark II is a fighting knife manufactured by Gerber Legendary Blades from 1966 to 2000, with an additional limited run of 1500 in 2002, and full production resuming as of July 2008. It was designed by retired United States Army Captain, Clarence A. “Bud” Holzmann, who based the pattern on a Roman Mainz Gladius.

Description
At 12.75 inches (32.39 cm) long it has a 6.5 inch (16.5 cm) 420 HC stainless steel double edged spear point wasp-waisted blade, weighs 8 ounces, and has a die cast aluminum handle. It has a distinctive look similar to that of the Fairbairn–Sykes fighting knife developed during World War II for the British Commandos. The Mark II was commonly carried by troops for the United States in the Vietnam War, and was second only to the Ka-Bar knife in fame. 

The MK II was the suggested blade in Paladin Press's controversial how to book, Hit Man: A Technical Manual for Independent Contractors.

Use
During the Vietnam War, the first production run of this knife had a five degree offset between the blade and the grip in order to ride in the sheath more comfortably, and give the user a grip similar to that of a fencing foil. This design feature led to a significant number of knives being returned by users for having a "bent blade", so Gerber discontinued that element on subsequent production runs. 

In the 1970s, the military's base/post exchanges discontinued selling these knives, reasoning that they were "not in good taste" or "too brutal". Al Mar, then working for Gerber as a knife designer, added the sawtooth serrations toward the hilt, marketing the knife as a "survival aid", making it more appealing to the PX System, which resumed selling the Mark II as a survival knife, rather than a fighting knife. 

Gerber manufactured a scaled down version of the Mark II known as the Mark I. The Mark I had a 4.75 inch (12 cm) blade and was marketed as a boot knife.

In popular culture
 The Mark II gained additional fame when it was used by Mel Gibson in his role of Max Rockatansky in the film of 1981, The Road Warrior.
 The black coated blade model of the Mark II was used during the mess hall knife play scene in the science fiction film Aliens.
 The film Captain America: The Winter Soldier (2014) features the Winter Soldier using a Mark II in a fight with Captain America.
 During a scene in Man of Steel (2013), Colonel Nathan Hardy (portrayed by actor Christopher Meloni) uses a Mark II in an attempt to fight the Kryptonian lieutenant Faora Hu-Ul, before Superman intervenes.
Casey Ryback (Steven Seagal) uses a Mark II throughout the film Under Siege (1992) most notably during the finale against William Strannix (Tommy Lee Jones)

See also
 List of daggers
 List of individual weapons of the U.S. Armed Forces
 OKC-3S Bayonet

References

External links
 Official Gerber Website
 Details on the Mark, Command, and Guardian series of Gerber knives
 Gerber Mark II Production Matrix
 Detailed information on the Mark II including production variations, packaging, advertisements, and accessories
 Images of the Gerber Mark II 20th Anniversary Edition prototype

Daggers
Military knives
Fiskars